The Norwegian National Badminton Championships is a tournament organized to crown the best badminton players in Norway.

The tournament started in 1939 and is held every year.

Past winners

References

External links 
 Badminton Europe - Norges Badminton Forbund

 
National badminton championships
Recurring sporting events established in 1939